James Watton (born 1 November 1936) is an English former footballer who played as a half-back. He made 129 league appearances in a six-year career in the Football League.

He began his career with English non-league side Bromsgrove Rovers and Dutch club De Graafschap, before joining Port Vale in September 1962. He was allowed to move onto Doncaster Rovers in July 1964. He helped "Donny" to the Fourth Division title in 1965–66, before he left the club for non-league side Burton Albion in 1968.

Career
Watton played for Bromsgrove Rovers and Dutch side De Graafschap, before joining Norman Low's Port Vale in September 1962. He made his debut in a 1–0 win at Colchester United on 10 September 1962, but only made four further Third Division appearances that season. He did not appear under new boss Freddie Steele in the 1963–64 season, and left Vale Park for Doncaster Rovers in July 1964. Rovers finished ninth in the Fourth Division in 1964–65 under the stewardship of Bill Leivers, before winning the league in 1965–66 after finishing ahead of Darlington on goal difference. They could not survive in the league above under new boss Keith Kettleborough however, and were relegated in 1966–67 after finishing nine points short of safety. They finished tenth in the Fourth Division in 1967–68 under the management of George Raynor. Watton then left Belle Vue and later played for Southern League side Burton Albion.

Career statistics
Source:

Honours
Doncaster Rovers
Football League Fourth Division: 1965–66

References

1936 births
Living people
Footballers from Wolverhampton
English footballers
Association football wing halves
Bromsgrove Rovers F.C. players
English expatriate footballers
Expatriate footballers in the Netherlands
De Graafschap players
Port Vale F.C. players
Doncaster Rovers F.C. players
Burton Albion F.C. players
English Football League players
Southern Football League players